Pedro Chaves dos Santos (born December 17, 1940) is a Brazilian politician. He has represented Mato Grosso do Sul in the Federal Senate since 2016. He is a member of the Social Christian Party.

References

Living people
1940 births
Members of the Federal Senate (Brazil)
People from Campo Grande
Social Christian Party (Brazil) politicians
Brazilian businesspeople